Thomas Knutsson (born 15 May 1958) is a Swedish sports shooter. He competed in the mixed trap event at the 1992 Summer Olympics.

References

External links
 

1958 births
Living people
Swedish male sport shooters
Olympic shooters of Sweden
Shooters at the 1992 Summer Olympics
People from Filipstad
Sportspeople from Värmland County